Lenox School District may refer to:
 Lenox Public Schools in Lenox, Massachusetts
 Lenox Community School District in Iowa
 Lennox School District (with two "n"s) in California
 New Lenox School District 122 in Illinois
 Lennox School District 41-4 in South Dakota